István Blazsetin (in Croatian: Stipan Blažetin) (Hercegszántó, Hungary, October 24, 1941 – Pécs, Hungary, March 4, 2001) was a Croatian writer, cultural worker and pedagogue from Hungary. According to some authors, he is considered to be a Croatian writer from Vojvodina, Serbia. He wrote poetry, novels and children's literature. Blažetin was an  important collector of oral literature heritage of the Pomurje Croats.

Biography 
He lived and worked in Hungarian town of Tótszerdahely (Serdahel).

As a worker in education, he was an important author of workbooks, audio textbooks, and teaching manuals. He was a member of the Croatian Writers Society. Blažetin wrote poetry for children in Croatian.

He was the father of the Croatian poet Stjepan Blažetin. The policy at that time dictated only Hungarian names could be used, so they are both shown as "István" in Hungarian documents.

Works 
Srce na dlanu, poetry, 1981
Bodoljaši, a novel for the children, 1986
Tralala, tralala, propjevala svirala, poetry for children, 1990
Korenje
Lirske narodne pjesme pomurskih Hrvata u Totszerdahelyju, Kajkavsko-čakavsko razmeđe, Kajkavski zbornik. Izlaganja na znanstvenim skupovima u Zlataru 1970-1974., Narodno sveučilište "Ivan Goran Kovačić", Zlatar, 1974. p. 117-123  (a collection of folk oral poetry)

Some of his poetry entered an anthology of Croatian poetry in Hungary, 1945-2000. Rasuto biserje (ed.: Stjepan Blažetin).

His works became the part of the anthology Pjesništvo Hrvata u Mađarskoj = Poemaro de kroatoj en Hungario (Poetry of Croats in Hungary) (ed.: Đuro Vidmarović, Marija Belošević and Mijo Karagić).

Awards 
 honorary title "Excellent educational worker"

References

External sources 

 Hrvatski glasnik (.pdf datoteka)
 Oktatási és Kulturális Minisztérium Okvirni program hrv. jezika i književnosti za dvojezične škole - Književna baština Hrvata u Mađarskoj
 Hrvatska književnost u Mađarskoj
 Književni krug Reči Rieč, poezija, proza, književnost Stipan Blažetin

1941 births
2001 deaths
People from Hercegszántó
Croats of Hungary
Croatian male poets
Croatian children's writers
20th-century Croatian poets
20th-century male writers